Santa Maria de Montmagastrell is a locality located in the municipality of Tàrrega, in Province of Lleida province, Catalonia, Spain. As of 2020, it has a population of 51.

Geography 
Santa Maria de Montmagastrell is located 63km east-northeast of Lleida.

References

Populated places in the Province of Lleida